Dr. Mukti and Other Tales of Woe is the sixth collection of short stories by Will Self.

Stories

Dr Mukti
Dr. Shiva Mukti is an overworked psychiatric doctor working in London. He feels dissatisfied. After an encounter with Dr Zack Busner the two begin trading patients of interest. However it soon becomes clear that despite Busner's failing health he is determined to exact his calculated revenge upon Dr. Mukti.

161
A young boy on the run from a local gang slips into the flat of an old man whose sight is failing. Hiding there he comes to exist in symbiosis with the old man and sees the world as he does from high above Liverpool.

The Five-swing Walk
A weekend dad considers the dull drudgery of his life as he wanders from park to park with his offspring and wonders whether he could effectively fake his own suicide to escape the machinations of the Child Support Agency.

Conversations with Ord
Two men indulge in a conversation pretending to be people that they aren't.

Return to the Planet of the Humans
A return to the world first established in Self's prior novel Great Apes and its protagonist, Simon Dykes.

Reception

The Guardian newspaper said of the collection...

"Like most of Self's work, these stories detail a massive loss, a misplacement, of humanity. In some sense they are actually about being a satirist, about being able to have so removed a point of view that you might as well be looking down from orbit."

However The Telegraph review gave a harsher appraisal...

"Will Self is going through a bad patch. I thought Dorian, his last novel, was pretty dire, but this new collection of stories is even worse. They are not funny, they are not clever, they are just a mess. Perhaps one day he will recover the form which made the outrageous Cock and Bull and, in a more sombre vein, How the Dead Live, so readable; but for the moment, he is floundering."

References

External links
Official Will Self site 

2004 short story collections
Short story collections by Will Self